Matteo Andreini (born 10 October 1981) is a San Marinese footballer who formerly played for Tre Fiori and the San Marino national team.

External links

1981 births
Living people
Sammarinese footballers
San Marino international footballers
S.P. Tre Fiori players
S.P. Cailungo players
Association football defenders